Gary J. McDowell (born April 21, 1952) is a U.S. politician from the state of Michigan. He was elected to three, two-year terms in the Michigan House of Representatives and served from January 1, 2005, until January 1, 2011. In 2010 and 2012, he was the Democratic nominee for  against Republican Dan Benishek. Prior to serving in the Michigan House of Representatives, McDowell was a member of the Chippewa County Board of Commissioners for 22 years. He also served on the Chippewa County Economic Development Corporation Board of Directors from 1987 until 2004.

Early life, education, and early career
McDowell was born and raised on a farm in Rudyard, Michigan. He is the oldest of ten children. His father was a John Deere salesman and a hay broker. His mother was a homemaker. He graduated from Rudyard High School in 1970 and attended Lake Superior State University.

In addition to being a farmer, he was also a United Parcel Service delivery driver for 23 years. He was a volunteer firefighter and emergency medical technician for 18 years.

Michigan House of Representatives

Elections
In 2002, he ran for Michigan's 107th House District, challenging incumbent Republican Scott Shackleton. He lost 69 percent to 31 percent. In 2004, Shackleton was term-limited from the Legislature and McDowell decided to run again. He defeated Walter North, a former member of the state Senate, 54 percent to 46 percent.

In 2006, he won re-election to a second term by defeating Republican Jay Duggan 59 percent to 41 percent. In 2008, he won re-election to a third and final term defeating Republican Alex Strobehn 65 percent to 35 percent.

Tenure
McDowell introduced 98 bills in six years in the Legislature. He has missed a total of 96 votes.

Committee assignments
2009
House Committee on Appropriations
Community Health subcommittee (Chairman)
Agriculture subcommittee (Vice Chairman)
Higher Education subcommittee

Congressional elections

2010

McDowell faced Benishek, independent Glenn Wilson, Libertarian nominee Keith Shelton, Green nominee Ellis Boal, and UST nominee Patrick Lambert in the general election. Democratic incumbent Bart Stupak had announced his retirement, leaving this an open seat.

2012

On September 15, 2011, McDowell announced his intent to run against Benishek in the 2012 election. He has been endorsed by the AFL-CIO and the Blue Dog Coalition. McDowell lost his bid to defeat Benishek for a second straight election, losing to the freshman incumbent by less than 2,000 votes of over 347,000 that were cast. McDowell considered challenging Benishek for a third time in the 2014 elections, but ultimately declined.

Personal life
McDowell lives in Rudyard with his wife Carrie. They have three daughters, Alivia, Emily and Rochelle, and two grandsons, Garrett and Bruin. He is a member of the Rudyard First Presbyterian Church.

References

External links
State Representative Gary McDowell at Michigan House Democrats
Gary McDowell for Congress  official campaign site
 
Campaign contributions at OpenSecrets.org

1952 births
Living people
Democratic Party members of the Michigan House of Representatives
Lake Superior State University alumni
People from Chippewa County, Michigan
20th-century American politicians
21st-century American politicians